Live at Rockpalast is a compilation live album by Joe Jackson.

Track listing
The box set contains three complete Rockpalast shows on two DVDs and two CDs.

Personnel 
 Joe Jackson – piano, vocals
 Graham Maby – bass, vocals
 Gary Sanford – guitar, vocals
 Dave Houghton – drums
 Sue Hadjopoulos – congas, bongos, xylophone
 Joy Askew – keyboards
Ed Rynesdal – keyboards

References

2012 albums
Joe Jackson (musician) albums